Silverbird Cinema is a movie theater in Port Harcourt, Rivers State, located at former Obi Wali Cultural Centre, Abonnema Wharf Road. It was opened in April 2009 and is owned and operated by Silverbird Group.

The eight-screen multiplex theater shows both local and foreign films from the most-profitable markets. It has a seating capacity of 1000 and a regular attendance of not less than 500.

References

Entertainment venues in Port Harcourt
2009 establishments in Nigeria
2000s establishments in Rivers State
Diobu, Port Harcourt
Tourist attractions in Port Harcourt
Theatres completed in 2009
Buildings and structures in Port Harcourt (local government area)
Cinemas and movie theaters in Nigeria
Silverbird Group
21st-century architecture in Nigeria